Private is an American Web series produced by Alloy Entertainment based on the novels of the same name by Kate Brian.

The series was announced in May 2009, beginning with a contest allowing female readers the chance to audition for the role of Kiran Hayes. It was also announced that the series would adapt the first four books via 20 episodes, each with a standard length of four to six minutes.

A DVD with episodes of the series was released by Newvideo.

Contest
Private: The Casting Call was the contest in which three contestants competed for the role of Kiran Hayes in the Web adaptation of Private.

Episode list

References

2009 web series debuts
American drama web series
Television series by Alloy Entertainment